The following outline is provided as an overview of and topical guide to energy:

Energy – in physics, this is an indirectly observed quantity often understood as the ability of a physical system to do work on other physical systems. Since work is defined as a force acting through a distance (a length of space), energy is always equivalent to the ability to exert force (a pull or a push) against an object that is moving along a definite path of certain length.

Forms of energy 

 Chemical energy – energy contained in molecules
 Electrical energy – energy from electric fields
Electro-centric energy – energy sustaining the continuous motion of free electrons.
 Gravitational energy – energy from gravitational fields
 Ionization energy – energy that binds an electron to its atom or molecule
 Kinetic energy –, energy of the motion of a body
 Magnetic energy – energy from magnetic fields
 Mechanical energy – The sum of (usually macroscopic) kinetic and potential energies
 Mechanical wave –, a form of mechanical energy propagated by a material's oscillations
 Nuclear binding energy – energy that binds nucleons to form the atomic nucleus 
 Potential energy – energy possessed by a body by virtue of its position relative to others, stresses within itself, electric charge, and other factors. 
 Elastic energy – energy of deformation of a material (or its container) exhibiting a restorative force
 Gravitational energy – potential energy associated with a gravitational field.
 Nuclear potential energy
 Radiant energy –, energy of electromagnetic radiation including light and of gravitational radiation
 Surface energy
 Thermal energy – a microscopic, disordered equivalent of mechanical energy
 Heat – an amount of thermal energy being transferred (in a given process)  in the direction of decreasing temperature
 Work (physics) – an amount of energy being energy transferred in a given process due to displacement in the direction of an applied force

Measurement

Units
 

List of common units for energy. Official or common symbol in brackets after name and exact or approximate value of unit in joule in brackets after description.

SI unit
 Joule (J) – the SI-unit for energy. Also called newton meter, watt second, or coulomb volt.

Other metric units
 Kilowatt-hour (kW·h) – corresponds to one kilowatt of power being used over a period of one hour.
 Calorie (cal) – equal to the energy need to raise the temperature of one gram of water by one degree Celsius (~4.184 J).
 Erg (erg) – unit of energy and mechanical work in the centimetre-gram-second (CGS) system of units (10−7 J).

Imperial or US Customary units
 British thermal unit (BTU) – equal to the energy need to raise the temperature of one pound of water by one degree Fahrenheit (~1055 J).
 Therm (thm) –  unit of heat energy. In the US gas industry it is defined as exactly 100,000 BTU59 °F. It is approximately the heat equivalent of burning  of natural gas (~105.5 MJ). 
 Quad – unit of energy equal to 1015 (a short-scale quadrillion) BTU.
 Foot-pound (ft·lbf or ft·lbf) –  unit of mechanical work, or energy, although in scientific fields one commonly uses joule (~1.356 J).

Other units
 Electronvolt (eV) – the amount of energy gained by a single unbound electron when it falls through an electrostatic potential difference of one volt (~1.60 × 10−19 J).
 Planck energy – natural unit of energy common in particle physics (~).
 Barrel of oil equivalent (BOE) – energy unit equal to the energy released when burning one barrel of oil (~6.12 GJ).
 Tonne of oil equivalent (toe) – energy unit equal to the energy released when burning one tonne of oil (~42 GJ).

Related units and concepts
 Volt
 Ampere
 Coulomb
 Enthalpy
 EU energy label
 Fill factor – defined as the ratio of the maximum power (Vmp x Jmp) divided by the short-circuit current (Isc) and open-circuit voltage (Voc) in light current density – voltage (J-V) characteristics of solar cells.
 Gigaton – Metric Unit of mass, equal to 1,000,000,000 (1 billion) metric tons, 1,000,000,000,000 (1 trillion) kilograms
 Any of various units of energy, such as gigatons of TNT equivalent, gigatons of coal equivalent, gigatons petroleum equivalent.
 Gray (unit) – (symbol: Gy), is the SI unit of energy for the absorbed dose of radiation. One gray is the absorption of one joule of radiation energy by one kilogram of matter. One gray equals 100 rad, an older unit.
 Heat
 Mass-energy equivalence – where mass has an energy equivalence, and energy has a mass equivalence
 Megawatt
 Net energy gain
 Power factor – of an AC electric power system is defined as the ratio of the real power to the apparent power.

Energy industry

Energy industry
 Worldwide energy supply, outline by country/region
 World energy resources and consumption
 List of energy resources, substances like fuels, petroleum products and electricity
 Energy crisis, the need to conserve energy resources
 Energy development, development of energy resources — ongoing effort to provide abundant and accessible energy, through knowledge, skills and construction
 Embodied energy, the sum total of energy expended to deliver a good or service as it travels through the economy
 Energy conservation, tips for conserving energy resources
 Energy economics, as the foundation of other relationships
 Energy policy, government policies and plans for energy supply
 Energy storage, methods commonly used to store energy resources for later use
 Energy system, an interpretation the energy sector in system terms
 Biosphere
 Ecological energetics
 Ecology
 Energy balance
 Earth Day
 Energy speculation
 Free energy suppression
 Future energy development – Provides a general overview of future energy development.
 History of perpetual motion machines
 Hubbert peak theory, also known as peak oil – the theory that world oil production will peak (or has peaked), and will then rapidly decline, with a corresponding rapid increase in prices.
 Primary production
 Power harvesting
 Renewable energy development

Energy infrastructure
See especially :Category:Electric power and :Category:Fuels for a large number of conventional energy related topics.
 Energy storage
 Electricity generation
 Electricity retailing
 Grid energy storage
 Liquified natural gas
 Microwave power transmission
 Power station
 Power supply
 Power transmission
 Underground power station

Energy applications
 Biofuel
 Distributed generation
 Electric vehicle
 Hybrid vehicle
 Hydrogen vehicle
 Passive solar building design
 Steam engine

History of energy

History of energy
 History of the energy industry
 History of coal
 History of coal mining
 
History of electromagnetic theory
History of electrical engineering
History of electronic engineering
 History of the electric generator
 History of the electric motor
 Timeline of the electric motor
 History of electric power transmission
 History of nuclear power
 History of petroleum
 History of the petroleum industry
 History of renewable energy
 History of alternative energy
 History of hydropower
 History of solar cells
 Growth of photovoltaics
 History of sustainability
 History of wind power
 Timeline of sustainable energy research 2020–present
 History of the steam engine
 Steam power during the Industrial Revolution

Physics of energy
 Energy
 Activation energy, explains the differences in the speeds of various chemical reactions
 Bioenergetics
 Chemical energetics
 Energy in physical cosmology
 Energy in Earth science that is responsible for the macroscopic transformations on the planet Earth
 Electricity
 Exergy
 Green energy
 Orders of magnitude (energy), list describing various energy levels between 10−31 joules and 1070 joules
 Thermodynamics
 Perpetual motion
 Heat
 History of energy
 Forms of energy, the forms in which energy can be defined
 Energy transformation, relating to energy's changes from one form to another.
 Energy (signal processing), the inner product of a signal in the time domain
 Energy density spectrum, relating to the distribution of signal energy over frequencies.
 Potential energy, the form of energy that is due to position of an object
 Kinetic energy, the form of energy as a consequence of the motion of an object or its constituents
 Mechanical energy, the potential energy and kinetic energy present in the components of a mechanical system
 Binding energy, a concept explaining how the constituents of atoms or molecules are bound together
 Bond energy, a measure of the strength of a chemical bond
 Nuclear energy, energy that is the consequence of decomposition or combination of atomic nuclei
 Osmotic power, also salinity gradient power or blue energy, the energy available from the difference in the salt concentration between seawater and river water
 Gibbs free energy, a related concept in chemical thermodynamics that incorporates entropy considerations
 Helmholtz free energy, a thermodynamic potential that measures the "useful" work obtainable from a closed thermodynamic system at a constant temperature, useful for studying explosive chemical reactions
 Elastic energy, which causes or is released by the elastic distortion of a solid or a fluid
 Ionization energy (IE), the energy required to strip an atom of an electron
 Interaction energy, the contribution to the total energy that is a result of interaction between the objects being considered
 Internal energy (abbreviated E or U), the total kinetic energy due to the motion of molecules (translational, rotational, vibrational) and the total potential energy associated with the vibrational and electric energy of atoms within molecules.
 Negative energy
 Energy conversion, process of converting energy from one form to another
 Dark energy, used to explain some cosmological phenomena
 Energy quality, empirical experience of the characteristics of different energy forms as they flow and transform
 Energy density, amount of energy stored in a given system or region of space per unit volume, or per unit mass
 Energy flow, flow of energy in an ecosystem through food chains
 Energetics (disambiguation), the scientific study of energy in general
 Stress–energy tensor, the density and flux of energy and momentum in space-time; the source of the gravitational field in general relativity
 Food energy, energy in food that is available
 Primary energy, energy contained in raw fuels and any other forms of energy received by a system as input to the system.
 Radiant energy, energy that is transported by waves
 Rotational energy, part of an object's total kinetic energy due to its rotation
 Solar radiation, radiant energy emitted by the sun, particularly electromagnetic energy
 Tidal power, also called tidal energy, is a form of hydropower that converts the energy of tides into useful forms of power - mainly electricity, dynamic tidal power, tidal lagoons, tidal barrages
 Wave power is the transport of energy by ocean surface waves, and the capture of that energy to do useful work — for example, electricity generation, water desalination, or the pumping of water (into reservoirs). Machinery able to exploit wave power is generally known as a wave energy converter (WEC).
 Wind energy is the kinetic energy of air in motion;Wind power is the conversion of wind energy into a useful form of energy, such as using wind turbines to make electricity, windmills for mechanical power, windpumps for water pumping or drainage, or sails to propel ships

Allegorical and esoteric
 Energy (esotericism), invoked by spiritualists for alternative modes of healing the human body as well as a spirit that permeates all of reality.
 Orgone, Wilhelm Reich discovered this energy and tried to use it to cure various physical ailments and control the weather.
 Bioenergetic analysis, body-oriented Reichian psychotherapy
 Qi, a concept from Oriental medicine that is sometimes translated as "energy" in the West.
 Vitalism, often referred to as "energy"
 Cold fusion, nuclear fusion at conditions close to room temperature.
 Bubble fusion, also known as Sonofusion, energy from acoustic collapse of bubbles.
 Water-fuelled car, powering a car using water as fuel.

Politics

Energy issues
 2000 Watt society
 Environmental concerns with electricity generation
 Fuel poverty
 Greasestock, American showcase of vehicles and technologies powered by alternative energy
 Low-carbon economy
Decarbonisation plans that get to zero CO2 emissions
 Peak Oil
 Soft energy path – an energy use and development strategy delineated and promoted by some energy experts and activists
 Strategic Petroleum Reserve (disambiguation)

Energy policies and use – national and international

International
 Energy policy – an introductory article
 Energy and Environmental Security Initiative

Regional and national

 Energy law – overview of many energy laws from various countries and states
 New York energy law
 Energy Tax Act – United States energy-related legislation. See also : :Category:United States federal energy legislation
 United Kingdom:
 Energy policy of the United Kingdom
 Energy use and conservation in the United Kingdom

Economics

Energy economics

Energy companies
 Exxon Mobil
 Enercon GmbH – Company based in Germany that operates in the wind turbine industry. One of the biggest producers in the world.
 Saudi Aramco
 Sasol
 United States Enrichment Corporation – contracts with the United States Department of Energy to produce enriched uranium.

Non-profit organizations
 Musicians United for Safe Energy

Industry associations
 OPEC – Organization of Petroleum-exporting Countries
 IEA – International Energy Agency
 CAPP – Canadian Association of Petroleum Producers
 World LP Gas Association – WLPGA

Innovators
 Alessandro Volta
 Charles Kettering
 Farrington Daniels – solar energy
 Georges Leclanché – battery
 John Frederic Daniell – Daniell cell
 Rudolf Diesel – compression ignition internal combustion engine
 Georges Imbert – wood gas
 Leonardo da Vinci
 Moritz von Jacobi
 Nicolaus Otto – internal combustion engine
 Robert Stirling – Stirling engine (external combustion)
 Nikola Tesla
 James Watt – steam engine with separate condensor

Lists
 List of books about energy issues
 List of energy abbreviations
 List of energy storage projects
 List of large wind farms
 List of notable renewable energy organizations
 List of photovoltaics companies
 List of renewable energy topics by country
 List of solar thermal power stations
 Index of wave articles
 List of wind turbine manufacturers

See also

 Energy (disambiguation)
 List of environment topics

References

External links 

Energy
Energy